Paulo Kesselring Carotini (10 September 1945 – 10 February 2022), also known as Polé, was a Brazilian water polo player. He competed in the men's tournament at the 1964 Summer Olympics.

Carotini died on 10 February 2022, at the age of 76. His brother is Ivo Carotini.

References

External links
 

1945 births
2022 deaths
Brazilian male water polo players
Olympic water polo players of Brazil
Water polo players at the 1964 Summer Olympics
Water polo players from São Paulo
20th-century Brazilian people